Sulhi Dölek (1948-2005) was a Turkish writer, satirist,  mechanical engineer and navy officer.

Sulhi Dölek was born in İstanbul on 20 September 1948. He joined the Turkish Navy and studied in the Naval Academy. For further studies, he went to the United States. He studied  mechanical engineering and marine engineering at Michigan University. He resigned from the Navy in 1988 in the rank of a Commander, and continued as a writer. He died on 7 November 2005 due to a cerebral infraction.

Even before his retirement, some of his short stories were published in the satirical magazine Akbaba.  He also wrote in the dailies Milliyet and Cumhuriyet.

Works
Below are his boks:

Novels
1975: Korugan ("Hangar")
1981: Geç Başlayan Yargılama ("A Delayed Trial" )
1982: Kiracı ("Tenant")
1988: Teslim ol Küçük ("Surrender, the Little One")
1991: Truva Katırı (The Mule of Troy)
1997: Kirpi ("Hedgehog")

Short story books
1983: Vidalar ("The Screws")
1994: Aynalar ("The Mirrors")

Essays and research books
1983: Yergi Nükte ve Fıkralarıyla Yusuf Ziya Ortaç ("Yusuf Ziya Ortaç with his Satires Epigram and Anectodes")
1990: Balığın şarkısı ("The song of the Fish")
1990: İçimizdeki Yasakçı ("The Forbidder Inside Us")  
1997: Habis’in Serüvenleri ("The Adventures of the Hangdog")

He also wrote a number of children's books.

TV and Drama
 Dünya Dönüyor ("The World Rotates")
 Süper Baba ("The Super Father")
 Külyutmaz ("The Cunning")
 İkinci Bahar ("Second Spring")
 Kirpi ("The Hedgehog")

References

1948 births
Writers from Istanbul
University of Michigan College of Engineering alumni
Turkish Navy officers
Turkish mechanical engineers
Turkish satirists
Turkish essayists
Turkish male short story writers
Turkish dramatists and playwrights
Turkish children's writers
Akbaba (periodical) people
Milliyet people
Cumhuriyet people
2005 deaths
20th-century essayists
Burials at Topkapı Cemetery